is a Japanese footballer who plays for SC Sagamihara from 2023.

Career
On 21 December 2022, Nukui joined to SC Sagamihara from 2023 season.

Club statistics
Updated to the end 2022 season.

References

External links

Profile at Cerezo Osaka 

1996 births
Living people
Association football people from Osaka Prefecture
People from Takatsuki, Osaka
Japanese footballers
J2 League players
J3 League players
Cerezo Osaka players
Cerezo Osaka U-23 players
Tochigi SC players
Mito HollyHock players
Fujieda MYFC players
SC Sagamihara players
Suzuka Point Getters players
Association football defenders